Louis Morissette (born July 19, 1973) is a Canadian actor and screenwriter from Drummondville, Quebec. He is most noted as a star and writer of the feature films The Mirage (Le Mirage) and The Guide to the Perfect Family (Le Guide de la famille parfaite).

He has also acted in the films The Comeback (Cabotins), Stay with Me (Reste avec moi), Liverpool, The Fall of the American Empire (La Chute de l'empire américain) and Goodbye Happiness (Au revoir le bonheur), and in the television series 3x rien, C.A. and Plan B; he has also been a regular writer for and sketch performer in Bye Bye, Ici Radio-Canada Télé's annual New Year's Eve special.

He is married to television and radio host Véronique Cloutier.

References

External links

1973 births
Living people
21st-century Canadian male actors
21st-century Canadian male writers
21st-century Canadian screenwriters
Canadian male film actors
Canadian male television actors
Canadian male screenwriters
Canadian screenwriters in French
Canadian sketch comedians
Canadian television writers
French Quebecers
Male actors from Quebec
People from Drummondville
Writers from Quebec